"Pull Up"  is a song by American rapper Wiz Khalifa featuring Lil Uzi Vert. It was released for digital download on May 24, 2016 by Atlantic Records as a standalone single. It was produced by Ricky P and TM88.

Music video 
On May 24, 2016 Khalifa uploaded the audio video for "Pull Up" on his YouTube account, and later, the music video on July 14, 2016.

Track listing 
Download digital
Pull Up (featuring Lil Uzi Vert) — 3:27

Charts

Certifications

Release history

References

2016 singles
2016 songs
Wiz Khalifa songs
Lil Uzi Vert songs
Atlantic Records singles
Songs written by Wiz Khalifa
Songs written by Lil Uzi Vert
Songs written by TM88